Warren Township High School (WTHS), or Warren, is a public four-year high school located in Gurnee, a northern suburb of Chicago, in Lake County, in Illinois. Because of size of the student body, the school is split across two campuses: the O'Plaine Road Campus for freshmen and sophomores, and the Almond Road Campus for juniors and seniors. It is part of Warren Township High School District 121.

History
Since its formation in 1917, Warren Township High School District 121 has grown and evolved with its residents. From a one-story building on O'Plaine Road to two campuses located about 4.5 miles apart, Warren has seen graduating initial classes of about 25 students in the beginning to more than 1000 today. There are more than 4,500 students divided between two campuses, representing one comprehensive high school program for more than 61,000 residents from Gurnee, Beach Park, Gages Lake, Grandwood Park, Grayslake, Lindenhurst, Old Mill Creek, Park City, Third Lake, Wadsworth, Waukegan, Wildwood and Lake Villa.

The first high school was erected in 1917. The one-floor school first opened in the fall of 1918 with 57 pupils in attendance. Between the years 1920 and 1924, a Vocational Agriculture Building and Farm Shop (separate from the school) were constructed. In 1926, a second floor and gymnasium were added to the 1917 structure. Additions to this structure were also made in 1951, 1956, 1960, 1968, and 1974.

On December 20, 1984, the high school building was destroyed by a fire. All students and staff moved to the Lake Forest West Campus where Warren Township High School existed from January 1985 to June 1987. Students and staff returned to Gurnee in August 1987 after the high school was rebuilt on the same site.

With enrollment continuing to increase, a second campus for Warren Township High School opened in 1997 for juniors and seniors. Called the Almond Campus, it is dependent on the O'Plaine Campus for amenities such as the football field, indoor pool and auditorium.

Two awards were presented to the high school in the 1999-2000 school year with a “Those Who Excel” recognition for creating a learning community throughout the school organization and the national “Blue Ribbon School” recognition from the U.S. Department of Education.

The last major construction project was partially completed in 2008 which included a renovation of the Almond Campus lunchroom. A 3 million dollar project that converted the black box theater into a larger seating area for students.

According to Warren's 2008 Report Card, the school failed to meet the minimum requirements for adequate yearly progress for the sixth year in a row. The school's 2008-09 Federal Improvement Status is Restructuring.  The school's 2008-09 State Improvement Status is Academic Watch Status Year 3.

Since the 2004-2005 Report Card, Warren has had the status of "Choice". This was intended to allow parents to transfer their children to a school with passing scores.

Since the 2005-2006 Report Card, Warren has had the status of "Supplemental Educational Services" under the federal law. This requires Warren to offer free outside tutoring to economically disadvantaged students.

The first NCLB report card was published in the fall of 2003, the first year of Dr. Sobocinski's superintendency.  The district failed to meet the minimum standards of NCLB in 2003, 2004, 2005, 2006, 2007 and 2008.  The failure was always the result of failures within subgroups. In the All-Student category, Warren met the AYP standard. In each of the six years, the school district was found to have required all 11th graders to take the state assessment.

Statistics

School overview
The overall view of the school through the Illinois Interactive Report Card.

Sports
Warren's Blue Devils compete in the North Suburban Conference.  The following sports are offered at Warren:

Football
Basketball
Soccer
Tennis
Swimming
Cross country
Track and field
Golf
Lacrosse
Diving
Volleyball
Gymnastics
Softball
Baseball
Bowling
Wrestling
Ice hockey
Water polo
Marching band

Notable alumni

Derek Shelton, Major League Baseball, Manager, Pittsburgh Pirates
Kevin Anderson, actor
Will Brooks, MMA fighter
Michael M. Crow, Arizona State University president
Brandon Paul, professional basketball player 
Dan Ronan, CNN correspondent
William G. Stratton, Governor of Illinois

References

External links
 Official website

Public high schools in Illinois
Gurnee, Illinois
Schools in Lake County, Illinois
1917 establishments in Illinois